Dreamgirls is a Broadway musical, with music by Henry Krieger and lyrics and book by Tom Eyen. Based on the show business aspirations and successes of R&B acts such as The Shirelles, James Brown, Jackie Wilson, and others, but closely follows the story of The Supremes as the musical follows the story of a young Black female singing trio from Chicago, Illinois  called "The Dreams", who become music superstars. 

Staged with a mostly African-American cast and originally starring Jennifer Holliday, Sheryl Lee Ralph, Loretta Devine, Ben Harney, Cleavant Derricks, Vondie Curtis-Hall, and Obba Babatundé, the musical opened on December 20, 1981, at the Imperial Theatre on Broadway. The musical  was then nominated for 13 Tony Awards, including the Tony Award for Best Musical, and won six. It was later adapted into a motion picture from DreamWorks and Paramount Pictures in 2006. The film starred Jamie Foxx, Beyoncé, Eddie Murphy, Jennifer Hudson, Danny Glover, Anika Noni Rose, and Keith Robinson.

Plot summary

Act I: 1960s
In 1962, The Dreamettes, a hopeful teenage Black girl group from Chicago, enter the famous Amateur Night talent competition at the Apollo Theater in Harlem, New York ("I'm Looking for Something", "Goin' Downtown", "Takin' the Long Way Home"). The group is composed of full-figured lead singer Effie White and her best friends, Deena Jones and Lorrell Robinson. For the contest, the Dreamettes sing "Move (You're Steppin' on My Heart)", a song written by Effie's brother, C.C., who accompanies them to the talent show. Unfortunately, they lose the talent show, but backstage, the girls and C.C. meet Curtis Taylor Jr., a car salesman who becomes the Dreamettes' manager.

Curtis convinces James "Thunder" Early, a popular R&B star, and his manager, Marty, to hire The Dreamettes as backup singers. Though Jimmy Early and the Dreamettes' first performance together is successful ("Fake Your Way to the Top"), Jimmy is desperate for new material. Curtis convinces Jimmy and Marty that they should venture beyond traditional rhythm and blues and soul audiences and aim for the pop market. C.C. composes "Cadillac Car" for Jimmy and the Dreamettes, who tour ("Cadillac Car (Reprise)") and record the single upon their return ("Cadillac Car (Second Reprise)"). "Cadillac Car" makes its way up the pop charts, but a cover version by white pop singers Dave and the Sweethearts ("Cadillac Car" (Third Reprise)) steals the original recording's thunder. Angered by "Cadillac Car"'s usurpation, Curtis, C.C., and Jimmy's producer, Wayne, resort to payola, bribing disc jockeys across the nation to play Jimmy Early and the Dreamettes' next single, "Steppin' to the Bad Side". As a result, the record becomes a major pop hit. Conflict arises between Marty and Curtis when Curtis moves in on Marty's turf, Jimmy Early. Curtis tries to convince Marty to change Jimmy's image and sound to appeal to the white audience and make Jimmy more successful, and suggests Jimmy play in Miami's Atlantic Hotel, a place that refuses to hire non-white performers; Marty rebuffs and tells Curtis to back off his client. Later, on Lorrell's 18th birthday party, Curtis, referring to himself as Jimmy's manager, calls the Atlantic Hotel's manager to discuss hiring Jimmy Early as a performer; at the same time, Effie and Curtis start a relationship, and Jimmy, a married man, starts an affair with Lorrell. Curtis then succeeds in getting Jimmy to perform in the Atlantic Hotel, which everyone celebrates ("Party, Party").

Strongly determined to make his Black singers household names, Curtis transforms Jimmy Early into a Perry Como-esque pop singer through his performance at the Atlantic Hotel with the Dreamettes ("I Want You Baby"), and later, concentrates on establishing the Dreamettes as their own act, renaming them The Dreams, changing their act to give them a more sophisticated and pop-friendly look and sound. The most crucial of these changes is the establishment of Deena as lead singer, instead of Effie. Effie is resentful of her change in status within the group. C.C. convinces her to go along with Curtis's plan ("Family"). After a fight between Marty and Curtis, Marty quits as Jimmy's manager and Curtis takes over. The Dreams make their club debut in the Crystal Room in Cleveland, Ohio, singing their first single ("Dreamgirls"). After a triumphant show, the press is eager to meet the newly minted stars ("Press Conference"). Curtis declares to Deena, "I'm going to make you the most famous woman who's ever lived," as the slighted Effie asks "What about me?" ("Only the Beginning"). Over the next few years, the Dreams become a mainstream success with hit singles. As Deena is increasingly feted as a star and Curtis continuously fixates on her, Effie becomes temperamental and unpredictable. She suspects Curtis and Deena of having an affair. Effie and Deena quarrel, while Lorrell attempts to keep peace between her bandmates. As Effie continues to disrupt performances and squabble with Deena, Curtis steps in and scolds Effie, warning her to stop. ("Heavy" & "Heavy (Reprise)")

In 1967, the group – now known as "Deena Jones and the Dreams" – is set to make their Las Vegas debut, with Jimmy stopping by to see the girls ("Drivin' Down the Strip"). Jimmy learns from C.C. that Effie had been missing performances; Deena is convinced that she is trying to sabotage the act, while C.C. is convinced that she missed shows because of illness. Curtis replaces Effie with a new singer, Michelle Morris, a change which Effie learns before anyone has a chance to tell her. Effie confronts Curtis, C.C., and the group and tries to tell them that she is pregnant ("It's All Over"), but despite her personal appeal to Curtis ("And I Am Telling You I'm Not Going"), the heartbroken Effie is left behind as Deena Jones and the Dreams forge ahead without her ("Love Love You Baby").

Act II: 1970s
By 1972, Deena Jones and the Dreams have become the most successful girl group in the country ("Dreams Medley"). Deena has married Curtis, and C.C. is in love with Michelle. Jimmy has gone years without a hit. Curtis shows little interest in updating or revitalizing Jimmy's act because of Curtis's preoccupation with Deena and because of Jimmy's habit of sneaking funk numbers into his repertoire of pop-friendly songs. Effie is back in Chicago, a single mother to her daughter, Magic (or Ronald in other versions), struggling to get another break. Marty, who is now her manager, compels her to rebuild her confidence and give up her "diva behaviors." Once she does, Effie is able to make a show business comeback ("I Am Changing"). In contrast to Effie's struggling return to her musical career, Deena wants to stop singing and become an actress. Deena informs Curtis of her career plans during a Vogue photo shoot ("One More Picture Please"), but Curtis refuses to let her go ("When I First Saw You"). Deena is not the only one chafing under Curtis's control: C.C. is enraged by Curtis's constant rearrangements of his songs, including an emotional ballad, entitled "One Night Only", which Curtis wants instead recorded to reflect the "new sound" he is inventing.

Deena Jones and the Dreams and Jimmy Early perform at a National Democratic fundraiser, on a bill featuring such groups as The Five Tuxedos ("Got to Be Good Times"). While waiting backstage to go on, Jimmy finds himself in another argument with Lorrell as to the nature of their relationship and when, or if, Jimmy will tell his wife about their affair ("Ain't No Party"). Lorrell is in tears as Jimmy takes to the stage to perform, and turns to Deena for support. As Jimmy pleads to Lorrell through his music ("I Meant You No Harm"), Deena tries to help Lorrell resolve her situation, and Michelle convinces the artistically frustrated C.C. to go find his sister and reconcile with her ("Quintette"). Midway through "I Meant You No Harm", Jimmy falls apart and decides that he "can't sing any more sad songs." Desperate to keep his set going, Jimmy launches into a wild, improvised funk number ("The Rap"), dropping his pants during the performance. An embarrassed Curtis fires Jimmy as soon as his set concludes ("Firing of Jimmy"). Lorrell ends her affair with Jimmy as well. The heartbroken Jimmy fades into obscurity, refusing to "beg" for Curtis' help.

Marty arranges for C.C. to meet and reconcile with Effie at a recording studio ("I Miss You, Old Friend"). C.C. apologizes for his role in handicapping her career, and Effie records C.C.'s "One Night Only" in its original ballad format. "One Night Only" begins climbing the charts, causing an enraged Curtis not only to rush-release Deena and the Dreams' version, but to use massive amounts of payola to push Deena's version up the charts and Effie's version down ("One Night Only (Disco)"). Effie, C.C., and Marty discover Curtis's scheme and confront him backstage at a Dreams concert, threatening legal action ("I'm Somebody" & "Faith in Myself"). As Curtis makes arrangements with Effie's lawyer to reverse his wrongdoings, Effie and Deena reconcile, and Deena learns Effie was pregnant with Curtis's child before her firing from the group. Realizing what kind of a man Curtis really is, Deena finally finds the courage to leave him and live her own life. Effie's "One Night Only" becomes a number-one hit, as the Dreams break up so that Deena can pursue her movie career. At their farewell concert ("Hard to Say Goodbye, My Love"), Effie rejoins the group on stage for the concert's final number, and all four Dreams sing their signature song one last time ("Dreamgirls (Reprise)").

Original Broadway production

Background
Dreamgirls had its beginnings as a project for Nell Carter. Playwright Tom Eyen and conductor Henry Krieger first worked together on the 1975 musical version of Eyen's play The Dirtiest Show in Town. Carter appeared in the musical, and her performance inspired Eyen and Krieger to craft a musical about black back-up singers, which was originally called One Night Only and then given the working title of Project #9. Project #9 was workshopped for Joseph Papp; Nell Carter was joined at this time by Sheryl Lee Ralph and Loretta Devine, who were to play her groupmates. The project was shelved after Carter departed to appear in the soap opera Ryan's Hope in 1978.

A year later, Project #9 was brought back to the table, after catching the interest of Michael Bennett, then in the midst of his success with A Chorus Line. Ralph and Devine returned, and Bennett had Eyen, who was to direct, begin workshopping Big Dreams, as the musical was now known. Joining the cast at this time were Ben Harney, Obba Babatunde, Cleavant Derricks, and twenty-year-old gospel singer Jennifer Holliday as Carter's replacement (after Carter accepted an offer from NBC to star in Gimme a Break). However, Holliday left the project during the workshopping phase, as she disliked the material and was upset that her character, Effie White, died at the conclusion of the first act. Eyen, Bennett, and Krieger continued to iron out the story and songs. Cheryl Gaines and Phyllis Hyman were both considered as replacements for Holliday.

After two mildly successful workshops which included Jenifer Lewis as Effie, Holliday returned to the project, now known as Dreamgirls. However, she found Effie's role had been reduced significantly in favor of Sheryl Lee Ralph's Deena character, and Holliday eventually quit the project again. After acquiring funding from music industry mogul David Geffen and fellow co-financiers ABC Entertainment, Metromedia, and the Shubert family, Bennett called Holliday back and agreed to rewrite the show's second act and build up her character.

Gender and racial issues are represented in Dreamgirls being a black-cast musical with three female lead roles. Being set in the 1960s, the Black Power Movement was influential on the story line with black artists starting to succeed in the music industry and black music becoming accessible to all audiences, which is a representation of racial boundaries being broken down. The story is based on three women working their way up in the music industry to achieve their dreams while the most powerful people in the industry are men. In the end, the women stand up for their rights and become influential figures.

Broadway

Dreamgirls premiered on Broadway at the Imperial Theatre on December 20, 1981, and closed on August 11, 1985, after 1,521 performances. The production was directed by Michael Bennett, produced by Bennett, Bob Avian, Geffen Records, and The Shubert Organization, and choreographed by Bennett and Michael Peters. It starred Sheryl Lee Ralph as Deena Jones, Jennifer Holliday as Effie White, Loretta Devine as Lorrell Robinson, Ben Harney as Curtis Taylor Jr., Cleavant Derricks as James "Thunder" Early, and Obba Babatundé as C. C. White. Dreamgirls proved to be a star-making vehicle for several of its performers, particularly Holliday, whose performance as Effie received significant praise.

Holliday's recording of Effie's solo "And I Am Telling You I'm Not Going" was a #1 single on the Billboard R&B charts in 1982. For the Dreamgirls original cast recording, the producers decided to present the intricately interwoven musical sequences as individual songs, cutting approximately half of the score. The cast recording won two Grammy awards, Best Musical Album and Best Vocal Performance for Jennifer Holliday's "And I Am Telling You I'm Not Going".

Subsequent productions

US tours
Bennett took Dreamgirls on an abbreviated national tour in 1983, with Jennifer Holliday remaining as Effie, with Larry Riley, Linda Leilani Brown, Arnetia Walker, Lawrence Clayton, and Cleavant Derricks' twin brother Clinton Derricks-Carroll as her co-stars. The show played extended engagements in three U.S. cities - Los Angeles, San Francisco, and Chicago but was dissolved due to high costs.

A second tour began in 1985, with Sharon Brown as Effie. By 1987, Lillias White, Jennifer Holliday's understudy in the first road production, had taken over the role. The tour ended with a Broadway revival at the Ambassador Theatre, which ran from June 28, 1987, to November 29, 1987, and was nominated for the 1988 Tony Award, Best Revival. By this time, Michael Bennett had fallen ill due to AIDS-related complications, and he died on July 2, 1987.

A US tour began in 1997 with direction and choreography by Tony Stevens, based on the original direction and choreography by Michael Bennett. The tour was set to open on Broadway in July 1998, however it ultimately closed in Upstate New York while waiting for a Broadway theatre to become available. In 2004, another national tour began starring American Idol contestant Frenchie Davis, who gained praise for her role as Effie.

Another US tour began at the Apollo Theater, New York City in November 2009, with direction and choreography by Robert Longbottom, new scenic design by the original set designer Robin Wagner, and new costume designs by William Ivey Long. American Idol alum Syesha Mercado starred as Deena, with Adrienne Warren as Lorrell, Moya Angela as Effie, Chester Gregory as Jimmy, and Chaz Lamar Shepherd as Curtis. This production included a new song for Deena and the Dreams at the top of Act II ("What Love Can Do"), as well as the song "Listen" from the film, which was re-written as a duet between Deena and Effie. In 2011 the creative team took the production to Montecasino, South Africa with a local cast, however, it closed early.

2001 Actors Fund of America Concert
In 2001 a concert performance of the show was staged on Broadway at the Ford Center for the Performing Arts starring Lillias White as Effie, Audra McDonald as Deena, Heather Headley as Lorrelle, Billy Porter as Jimmy, Darius de Haas as C.C., Tamara Tunie as Michelle, and Norm Lewis as Curtis, with appearances by E. Lynn Harris, Adriane Lenox, Brian Stokes Mitchell, Alice Ripley, Emily Skinner, and Patrick Wilson among many others. The concert was in benefit of the Actors Fund of America, and was one of the first major  public gatherings to be held in New York City after 9/11. It was recorded and later released in its entirety on CD.

West End
In February 2016 it was confirmed that Dreamgirls would have its London premiere at The Savoy Theatre with Amber Riley taking on the role of Effie White. Previews began on November 19, 2016, with an official opening on December 14 of that year. Riley initially performed the role for 7 out of 8 shows per week, but in July 2017 reduced her performances to 6 times a week and then 5 in August, with Marisha Wallace and Karen Mav serving as alternates. Riley left the role and from November 20, 2017, forward, Moya Angela, who played the role of Effie in the 2009 US tour, Marisha Wallace and Karen Mav all shared the role of Effie. The production was directed and choreographed by Casey Nicholaw, with scenic design by Tim Hatley, costume design by Gregg Barnes, sound design by Richard Brooker and lighting design by Hugh Vanstone.

The production closed on January 12, 2019.

UK tour 
In December 2021 Dreamgirls began an 15 month tour of the UK. Previews began on December 14 at the Liverpool Empire Theatre with its press night on December 21 before visiting 26 more venues. The role of Effie White is performed by Nicole Raquel Dennis. Sharlene Hector is the alternate Effie White, Hector is well known for being a lead vocalist for British band Basement Jaxx. The production was directed and choreographed by Casey Nicholaw, with scenic design and costume design by Tim Hatley, sound design by Richard Brooker and lighting design by Hugh Vanstone.

Casts of notable productions

Musical numbers

Act I
 "I'm Looking for Something" – The Stepp Sisters, Marty and Company
 "Goin' Downtown" – Little Albert & the Tru-Tones
 "Takin' the Long Way Home" – Tiny Joe Dixon
 "Move (You're Steppin' on My Heart)" – Effie, Deena and Lorrell
 "Fake Your Way to the Top" – Jimmy, Effie, Deena and Lorrell
 "Cadillac Car" – Curtis, Jimmy, C.C., and Marty, Effie, Deena and Lorrell
 "Cadillac Car (Reprise)" – Company
 "Cadillac Car (Second Reprise)" – Jimmy, Effie, Deena and Lorrell
 "Cadillac Car (Third Reprise)" – Dave and the Sweethearts
 "Steppin' to the Bad Side" – Curtis, Jimmy, C.C., Wayne, Lorrell, Effie, Deena and Company
 "Party, Party" – Company
 "I Want You Baby" – Jimmy, Effie, Deena and Lorrell
 "Family" – Effie, C.C., Jimmy, Lorrell, Curtis and Deena
 "Dreamgirls" – Deena, Lorrell and Effie
 "Press Conference" – Company
 "Only the Beginning" – Curtis, Deena, and Effie
 "Heavy" – Deena, Lorrell, and Effie
 "Heavy (Reprise)" - Effie, Deena, Lorrell, and Curtis
 "Drivin' Down the Strip" – Jimmy
 "It's All Over" – Effie, Curtis, C.C., Deena, Lorrell, Jimmy and Michelle
 "And I Am Telling You I'm Not Going" – Effie
 "Love Love You Baby" – Deena, Lorrell and Michelle

Act II
 "Dreams Medley" 1 – Deena, Lorrell, and Michelle
 "I Am Changing" – Effie
 "One More Picture, Please" – Company, Lorrell, Michelle, C.C. and Curtis
 "When I First Saw You" – Curtis and Deena
 "Got to Be Good Times" – The Five Tuxedos
 "Ain't No Party" – Lorrell and Jimmy
 "I Meant You No Harm" – Jimmy
 "Quintette" – Lorrell, Deena, C.C., Michelle and Jimmy
 "The Rap" – Jimmy, C.C., Lorrell, and Company
 "Firing of Jimmy" – Jimmy, Curtis, Lorrell and Company
 "I Miss You Old Friend" – Les Styles, Marty, C.C. and Effie
 "One Night Only" – Effie
 "One Night Only (Disco)" – Deena, Lorrell, Michelle, Curtis and Company
 "I'm Somebody" – Deena, Lorrell and Michelle
 "Faith in Myself" 2 – Effie
 "Hard to Say Goodbye, My Love" – Deena, Lorrell and Michelle
 "Dreamgirls (Reprise)" – Effie, Deena, Lorrell and Michelle

Notes
 1 The original Act II opening was a medley reprising the songs "Dreamgirls", "Move (You're Steppin' on My Heart)", "Love Love You Baby", "Family", "Heavy" and "Cadillac Car", performed by Deena Jones and the Dreams, followed by most of the company in a reprise of "Press Conference". When the musical's national tour began in 1983, the Act II opening medley was changed to consist of a reprise of "Dreamgirls" and a new song, "Step on Over"; the "Press Conference" reprise was removed. With the new national tour in 2009, a new song was written, entitled "What Love Can Do", which was paired with "Step on Over" to form a new Act II opening. Willie Reale, who had co- written a song for the film adaptation, wrote the song's lyrics. For the 2016 West End run, the Act II opening was revised once again to a full-length reprise of "Love Love You Baby" with new lyrics by Willie Reale.
 2 Listen, a song originally written for the film adaptation, was modified for and added to the 2009 U.S. tour production of Dreamgirls and replaced an unnamed number after "Faith in Myself". "Listen"'s lyrics was revised for the 2016 West End production. Music and lyrics by Henry Krieger, Scott Cutler, Anne Preven, Beyoncé and Willie Reale.

Awards and honors

Original Broadway production

Original West End production

Film adaptation

David Geffen, founder of Geffen Records and one of the play's financiers, leased the Dreamgirls film rights to Warner Bros. in the 1980s through his Geffen Pictures company. Although the film was announced several times, with singers such as Whitney Houston (as Deena), Lauryn Hill (another Deena candidate), and Kelly Price (as Effie) tapped to star, the studio eventually abandoned the project. Geffen eventually began development on the film at DreamWorks SKG, a company he co-founded, in 2004. Warner Bros., which controlled the film rights to Dreamgirls, was also originally announced as a co-financier of the film, but before shooting began, Paramount Pictures stepped in as co-producer after Warner expressed concerns over the film's budget. Laurence Mark served as producer of the DreamWorks/Paramount adaptation of Dreamgirls, written and directed by Bill Condon, who had earned an Oscar nomination for his screenplay adaptation of Chicago.

The film adaptation of Dreamgirls stars Jamie Foxx as Curtis, Beyoncé as Deena, Eddie Murphy as Jimmy, Danny Glover as Marty, Jennifer Hudson as Effie, Anika Noni Rose as Lorrell, and Keith Robinson as C.C.. Dreamgirls was first exhibited in special ten-day road show engagements beginning December 25, 2006. Subsequently, the film went into national release on December 25, 2006. Loretta Devine, who originated the Lorrell role, has a cameo role as a jazz singer in the film. Two other alumni of the Broadway production – Hinton Battle (a James "Thunder" Early replacement) and Yvette Cason (Charlene; Effie White understudy) – also appear. While much of the material remains the same as that of the stage musical, some of the stage musical's songs (most notably "Ain't No Party" and the Act II Opener) were removed, and four new songs were added. A number of changes were made to the story as well, including the additions of more overt references to The Supremes and Motown, the death of Jimmy (who is found dead on the road after a heroin overdose), and the relocation of the story's main setting from Chicago to Detroit. The film won two Academy Awards: Best Supporting Actress (Jennifer Hudson) and Best Sound Mixing.

To give the story more exposure for the upcoming film release, DreamWorks Pictures and the licensee of the original play, The Tams-Witmark Music Library, announced they would pay the licensing fees for all non-professional stage performances of Dreamgirls for the calendar year of 2006. DreamWorks hoped to encourage amateur productions of Dreamgirls, and familiarize a wider audience with the play. As a result, more than fifty high schools, colleges, community theaters, and other non-commercial theater entities staged productions of Dreamgirls in 2006, and DreamWorks spent up to $250,000 subsidizing the licensing.

Similarities to The Supremes' story
From the show's opening, Michael Bennett, Henry Krieger, Tom Eyen, and the Dreamgirls producers publicly denied basing the musical's plot on the story of the Supremes. It is widely believed these public denials were made in order to avoid lawsuits from the Supremes, Berry Gordy, and Motown as the similarities in the plot and the Supremes' story were strikingly close. Mary Wilson loved Dreamgirls so much that she named her first autobiography, Dreamgirl: My Life As a Supreme after the musical. Diana Ross publicly denied ever seeing the show despite including "Family" in her 1983 Central Park concert. A Broadway urban myth circled at the time that Ross had seen the show in disguise and stormed out at the end of Act I upset. In an Oprah: Where Are They Now? interview from 2014, Ralph said Michael Bennett instructed her not to portray Deena like Diana Ross or else they would be sued. In the same interview, Ralph recalled encountering Ross in New York shortly after the musical's opening where Ross coldly brushed her off, leading her to speculate that Ross had seen or knew of the show. Tom Eyen denied that he had the Supremes in mind when he wrote the book. He is quoted as saying in 1986: "I didn't grow up with the Supremes...I grew up with the Shirelles. Dreamgirls isn't about any one group. It's a cavalcade of black Motown singers: the Shirelles, the Chiffons, Martha and the Vandellas, Little Richard and Stevie Wonder. All the characters are larger than life." Early in Michael Bennett's career, he was a dancer on the 1960s NBC musical variety series Hullabaloo (TV series) where he danced behind The Supremes on several of their appearances on the show. 

Similarities between true life events and the plot of the musical include:
 Both the Supremes and the Dreams started off with "ettes" in their group's name. The Supremes were originally the Primettes; the Dreams start off as the Dreamettes.
 Both the Supremes and the Dreams did background vocal work for established recording artists before becoming famous.
 Diana Ross was chosen as the lead singer of the Supremes because of her distinctive, softer, commercial voice with crossover appeal, just as Deena Jones is chosen as the lead singer of the Dreams due to similar qualities. 
 The storyline of the love affair between Deena Jones and Curtis Taylor Jr. mirrors Diana Ross and Berry Gordy Jr.'s love affair and the emphasis of Diana's/Deena's success over the group's.
 The storyline of Lorrell Robinson and James "Thunder" Early's relationship resembles Mary Wilson's relationships with fellow Motown artists as well as Welsh singer Tom Jones.
 Deena Jones is coached to be the spokesperson for the group during press conferences, just as Diana Ross was for the Supremes.
 The press was instructed to refer to Diana Ross as "Miss Ross." In Dreamgirls, the press is instructed to refer to Deena Jones as "Miss Jones."
 As Diana Ross was pushed forward as the star of the Supremes, Florence Ballard became difficult to work with when she was forced into the background. Effie White reacts in the same manner when Deena Jones is pushed forward as the star of the Dreams.
 Florence Ballard and the character Effie White missed performances, recording sessions, allegedly illnesses, and gained weight, which resulted in them being fired from their groups in Las Vegas in 1967. 
 Cindy Birdsong went on to perform with the Supremes the same night Florence Ballard was fired, just as Michelle Morris goes on to perform with the Dreams the same night Effie White is fired.
 The Supremes became "Diana Ross & the Supremes" in 1967 while in Las Vegas. The Dreams became "Deena Jones & the Dreams" in 1967 while in Las Vegas.
 After Diana Ross left the Supremes in 1970 to pursue other projects such as film work, in 1972 she starred in her first motion picture, the Motown-produced Lady Sings the Blues. The character of Deena Jones leaves the Dreams in 1972 to pursue a career as an actress.

See also
 Dreamgirls: Original Broadway Cast Album
 Dreamgirls: Music from the Motion Picture
 Dreamgirl: My Life As a Supreme, the 1986 autobiography of former Supremes member Mary Wilson

Notes

References
 Hill, Jeremy. Dreamgirls: Your Virtual Coffee Table Book of the Musical. Retrieved November 10, 2006.
 Ksharrity. Final Essay on Dreamgirls. Retrieved May 22, 2017.

External links

 
 Dreamgirls audition advice & show information from MusicalTheatreAudition.net
 Dreamgirls study guide from TUTS

 
1981 musicals
Broadway musicals
All-Black cast Broadway shows
Musicals inspired by real-life events
West End musicals
Tony Award-winning musicals